Thomas Lenworth Wynter (born 20 June 1990) is an English semi-professional footballer who plays for Hythe Town as a left-back.

Career
Born in Ashford, Kent, Wynter joined Gillingham's youth system at under-15 level, and signed as a professional at the beginning of the 2008–09 season. After loan spells at Ramsgate and Dover Athletic, he made his league debut for Gillingham on 26 December 2009 in the home 1–0 defeat to Brentford.

Wynter rejoined former club Dover Athletic on a two-year deal in August 2010 after Gillingham decided not to renew his contract.

Wynter joined Dartford in September 2015 and became a regular at left back until leaving the club for Margate on 11 May 2017.

In June 2019, Wynter returned to Ramsgate.

References

External links
Gillingham FC profile

1990 births
Living people
Footballers from Lewisham
English footballers
Association football defenders
Gillingham F.C. players
Ramsgate F.C. players
Dover Athletic F.C. players
Dartford F.C. players
English Football League players
Margate F.C. players